The 1988 Toronto municipal election was held to elect members of municipal councils, school boards, and hydro commissions in the six municipalities that made up Metropolitan Toronto, Ontario, Canada. The election was held  November 14, 1988. This election also marked the abolition of Boards of Control in North York, Etobicoke, Scarborough, and York. The Toronto Board of Control had been abolished in 1969.

Metro

The 1988 campaign was the first time most members of Metro Toronto were directly elected. Toronto had moved to direct elections in 1985, but the other cities had still had a selection of council members dually seated at Metro. In the new council only the five mayors would be granted automatic Metro seats.

East York
Peter Oyler - 11,088
Avril Usha Velupillai - 7,885
Bob Willis - 2,043

Lakeshore Queensway
Chris Stockwell - 10,442
Morley Kells - 7,790

Kingsway Humber
Dennis Flynn - 16,642
Jack Soules - 4,497

Markland Centennial
Dick O'Brien - 13,049
Leonard Braithwaite - 7,296

Rexdale Thistletown
Lois Griffin - acclaimed

North York Humber
Mario Gentile - 19,697
Angelo Natale - 4,795

Black Creek
Maria Augimeri - 19,244
Camilo Tiqui - 2,462
Sherland Chhangur - 2,391

North York Spadina
Howard Moscoe - acclaimed

North York Centre South
Bev Salmon - 10,618
Gordon Chong - 7,223

North York Centre
Norman Gardner - acclaimed

Don Parkway
Marie Labette - 14,443
Courtney Doidron - 3,108

Seneca Heights
Joan King - acclaimed

Scarborough Bluffs
Brian Ashton - 9,957
Bill Belfontaine - 8,348

Scarborough Wexford
Maureen Prinsloo - 6,007
Bryan Prettie - 4,922

Scarborough Centre
Brian Harrison - 8,516
Barry Christensen - 5,150
Keith Sutherland - 1,906

Scarborough Malvern
Bob Sanders - 4,780
Hugh Evelyn - 3,575
Chris Burry - 1,309
Yaqoob Khan - 1,308
Roy Paluoja - 448

Scarborough Highland Creek
Ken Morrish - acclaimed

Scarborough Agincourt
Scott Cavalier - 8,175
Eden Gajraj - 1,861

 High Park
Derwyn Shea - 11,473
Ben Grys - 9,204

Trinity Niagara
Joe Pantalone - 8,717
Lamartine Silva - 3,864

Davenport
Richard Gilbert - 7,880
Dennis Fotinos - 5,133

North Toronto
Anne Johnston - acclaimed

Midtown
Ila Bossons - 7,924
Ying Hope - 7,196
Bill Granger - 4,375

Downtown
Dale Martin - 10,322
Janly Pang - 3,950

Don River
Roger Hollander - 11,785
Richard Yue - 5,447

East Toronto
Paul Christie - 11,187
Linda Lynch - 9,361

York Eglinton
Mike Colle - 11,527
Jacquie Chic - 3,571

York Humber
Alan Tonks - acclaimed

Lakeshore Queensway Councillor Chris Stockwell resigned when he won a seat in the 1990 Provincial Election. A by-election was held on November 29, 1990.

Blake Kinahan - 1,770
Bruce Davis - 1,520
Ron Barr - 1,150
Jeff Knoll - 994
Richard Clupa - 657
Helen Wursta - 550
Kevin McGourty - 221
Agnes Ugolini Potts - 213
Branko Gasperlin - 180
Aileen Anderson - 157
Maureen Hunter Dennis - 107
Stephen Elkerton - 62

Toronto

Mayor
Incumbent mayor Art Eggleton faced little opposition in his bid for his fourth term of office. His closest opponent was New Democrat Carolann Wright, a community activist running on an anti-poverty platform.

Results
Art Eggleton - 91,180
Carolann Wright - 24,479
Bill Roberts - 7,235
Don Andrews - 5,690
John Kellerman - 3,197
Jim Atherton - 2,459
Ben Kerr - 2,204
Zoltan Szoboszlov - 2,202
Alan Ritchie - 1,869

City council

There was the largest turnover in councillors in this election since the 1972 election. The left on council ran a joint Reform Toronto campaign focused on curbing the development industry. The vote was a major triumph for the left on city council with two prominent and long-serving conservatives defeated: Fred Beavis, who had served on council since 1961, was defeated by environmentalist Marilyn Churley, and in the north end, conservative Michael Gee lost to Howard Levine.

Ward 1 (Swansea and Bloor West Village)
William Boytchuk (incumbent) - 7,686
David Garrick - 4,092

Ward 2 (Parkdale
Chris Korwin-Kuczynski (incumbent) - 7,242
Francine Dick - 1,312
Michael Sarazen - 412
Thomas Bose - 348

Ward 3 (Brockton)
Tony O'Donohue (incumbent) - 4,269
Jimmy Talpa - 837

Ward 4 (Trinity-Bellwoods and Little Italy)
Martin Silva - 3,529
Nick Figliano - 1,494
Tony Letra - 1,266
Joey Pimental - 675

Ward 5 (Financial District, Toronto - University of Toronto)
Liz Amer- 3,481
Peter Maloney - 2,336
Rachel Foulkes - 1,226
Steve BFG Johnson - 417
Ray Barker - 224

Ward 6 Downtown East
Jack Layton (incumbent) - 5,486
Lois MacMillan-Walker - 1,480

Ward 7 (Regent Park and Cabbagetown)
Barbara Hall (incumbent) - 4,748
Mike Armstrong - 1,536
Allan Boudreau - 499

Ward 8 (Riverdale)
Marilyn Churley - 5,771
Fred Beavis (incumbent) - 4,192
Paul Ralna - 1,028

Ward 9 (East Danforth)
Tom Clifford (incumbent) - 5,220
Mitchell Kosny - 3,498
Michael Tegtmeyer - 370

Ward 10 (The Beaches)
Tom Jakobek (incumbent) - 9,782
Glenn Middleton - 2,443

Ward 11 (The Junction)
Rob Maxwell - 3,299
Peter Zahakos - 3,119
Melania Leshko - 545

Ward 12 (Davenport and Corso Italia)
Betty Disero (incumbent) - acclaimed

Ward 13 (The Annex and Yorkville)
Nadine Nowlan (incumbent) - acclaimed

Ward 14 (Forest Hill)
Howard Levine - 5,477
Michael Gee (incumbent) - 4,995

Ward 15 (Western North Toronto)
Kay Gardner (incumbent) - 7,955
Jeffrey Stutz - 1,966
Bob Murphy - 1,591

Ward 16 (Davisville and Lawrence Park)
Michael Walker (incumbent) - 5,436
Malcolm Martini - 5,249
Joanne Short - 722

Results are taken from the November 15, 1988 Toronto Star and might not exactly match final tallies.

By-election
Ward 8 Councillor Marilyn Churley resigned upon winning a seat in the 1990 Provincial Election. A by-election was held on November 29, 1990:
Peter Tabuns - 3,217
Linda Lynch - 2,421
Carol Mark - 521
Susan Millingen - 195
Donald Andrews - 137
Daniel Browning - 97

Borough of East York
The election in East York was a rather tame affair with the mayor, Dave Johnson handily re-elected by a large plurality. On Council five of eight members were new but only one incumbent, Bob Dale was defeated. Incumbent Steve Mastoras was re-elected but demoted to Junior Councillor in Ward 2.

† - denotes incumbent status from previous council

Mayor
†Dave Johnson - 20,234
Herbert T. McGroarty - 3,531
Robert Ruminski - 713

Councillor
Two councillors were elected to each ward.

Ward 1
Case Ootes - 2,903
Michael Prue - 2,413
John Papadakis - 1,101
Melanie Milanich - 868
John Couvell - 398
Michael Grosso - 303
Alex Parucha - 292

Ward 2
†Bill Buckingham - 4,275
†George Vasilopolous - 3,920
Paul Robinson - 3,351

Ward 3
Helen Kennedy - 3,418
†Steve Mastoras - 3,006
†Bob Dale - 2,561
Anastasios Baxevanidis - 609

Ward 4
Lorna Krawchuk - 4,343
Jenner Jean-Marie - 4,016
Steve Gorgey - 2,686
Ghamsh Kara - 1,713

Trustee
Ward 1 (3 to be elected)
†Gail Nyberg - 2,419
Janet McKeown - 1,781
Dennis Kolby - 1,503
Randy Silar - 1,146
Grace Stephens - 907

Ward 2 (1 to be elected)
†Connie Culbertson - 3,553
†Ken Maxted - 3,069
Alexander Kory - 1,679

Ward 3 (3 to be elected)
Margaret Hazelton - 2,643
Len Self - 1,884
Shirley Boast - 1,205
Russell English - 609

Ward 4 (3 to be elected)
Elca Rennick - 4,128
Ruth Goldhar - 3,978
Henry Friesen - 1,447
Abdul Hal Patel - 954

Hydro Commission
(2 to be elected)
†Frank E. Johnson - 13,033
John Flowers - 9,801
Georgia Dunn - 8,964
John Nursey - 3,334

City of Etobicoke

Mayor
(incumbent)Bruce Sinclair: 45,860
Terry Howes: 13,081
Margaret Krell: 6,547
Robert Goddard Young: 6,269
Neville Berry: 4,146

City Councillors
Ward 1
Irene Jones: 3,404
(incumbent)Helen Wursta: 1,752
Frank Falcone: 780
Harold Merten: 334

Ward 2
(incumbent)Alex Faulkner: 4,288
Richard Clupa: 1,484
James Shawera: 292

Ward 3
Ross Bissell: 2,747
Aileen Anderson: 2,055
Martha MacGray: 1,825
John Cudahy: 942

Ward 4
Michael O'Rourke: 2,303
Jane Scott: 1,312
Elizabeth Holmes: 1,225
Chris O'Toole: 1,081
Al Kolyn: 923
Geoffrey Grossmith: 815

Ward 5
Anne Methot: 2,150
Sperril Chambers: 1,623
Al Allman: 1,334
Steven Davis: 1,041
Ken Lopez: 721
Gino Marranghi: 373

Ward 6
Douglas Holyday
(incumbent)Ron Barr: 1,358
John Woodroof: 1,314
Tom Ferguson: 509

Ward 7
(incumbent)Gloria Luby: 4,209
Alida Leistra: 3,344

Ward 8
(incumbent)Mary Huffman: 4,189
John Alati: 3,841

Ward 9
(incumbent)Alex Marchetti: 4,473
Leonard Zaleski: 1,597

Ward 10
(incumbent)David Robertson (acclaimed)

Ward 11
(incumbent)Karen Herrell: 2,658
Raj Chopra: 780

Ward 12
(incumbent)John Hastings: 1,260
Ed McWilliams: 998
Peter Hutchens: 968
Shan Rana: 617

City of Scarborough

Mayor
Joyce Trimmer: 53,566
Norm Kelly: 48,701
Owen: 7,951
O'Malley: 3,137
Max French: 1,509
Abel Van Wyk: 939

City Councillors
Ward 1 
Harvey Barron ; 5,077
Webster ; 1,856

Ward 2
Gerry Altobello ; 4,392
Cayenne ; 2,483

Ward 3
John Wardrope ; 4,887
Duncan ; 1,948
Kazia ; 1,017

Ward 4
Lorenzo Berardinetti ; 2,453
Kurt Christensen ; 2,449
Glynwilliams ; 1,936
Ward ; 1,011
McDowell ; 318
Georges Legault ; 292

Ward 5 
 Marilyn Mushinski ; Acclaimation

Ward 6
Paul Mushinski; 1,997
Elliott ; 1,514
Lombardi ; 1,288
Michalopoulo ; 1,078
McPherson ; 864
Cavoto ; 544
Sharma ; 524

Ward 7
Fred Johnson, F ; 5,209
Borisko ; 4,259

Ward 8
Shirley Eidt ; 5,487
Murray ; 2,013
Chadha ; 651

Ward 9 
Ron Moeser ; 4,655
John Mackie ; 4,539
Roberts ; 1,385
Cocco ; 1,193
Vaya ; 221

Ward 10 
Ron Watson; 3,961
Mahood, P ; 2,828
Wilson, M ; 544
Cotter ; 478

Ward 11
Sherene Shaw ; 2,458
Lombardi, D ; 1,308
Munro ; 1,155
Edmonds ; 1,035
Jacobs ; 907
Zaidi ; 422

Ward 12
Doug Mahood; 5,759
Cheung, K ; 1,754

Ward 13 
Bas Balkissoon ; 2,269
Pratley ; 2,249
Cheung, J ; 1,148
Clements ; 1,003
Bob Watson; 541
Wilson, L ; 519

Ward 14 
Edith Montgomery ; 4,956
Loughlin, B ; 947
Nafis ; 489

Public Utilities Commission
Cavanagh ; 55,439
Beatty ; 50,044
Stewart ; 39,197
Olders ; 10,530

City of North York
Mel Lastman was re-elected mayor of the North York for the sixth consecutive time. His wife, Marilyn also tried to obtain a council seat but was defeated by former school trustee Bob Bradley. Only one incumbent councillor, Bob Yuill was defeated in Ward 8 by newcomer Joanne Flint. All other councillors were re-elected.

Mayor
x-Mel Lastman 98,856 
Mike Foster 13,486 
Douglas Campbell 10,290 
Freddie Jay 1,939

Council
Ward 1
x-Mario Sergio 6,365 
Tony Marzilli 2,881 
Fred Craft 859

Ward 2
Judy Sgro 6,882 
Gerry Iuliano 2,398 
Luigi Cavaleri 926

Ward 3
x-Peter Li Preti 5,123 
Peter Pallotta 808 
Nella Lanzellotti 759 
Shanta Ramotar 486

Ward 4
x-Frank Di Giorgio 3,658 
Maria Rizzo 2,933 
Eleanor Rosen 1,084 
Gino Cipollone 239 
Rhea Horwich 226

Ward 5

Frank Crudo was a 26-year-old design and construction company project manager during the 1988 election. He called for a stronger campaign against drugs on North York's streets.  When Anthony Perruzza was elected to the Legislative Assembly of Ontario in 1990, Crudo applied to the North York council to be selected as his replacement. He was rejected in favor of Claudio Polsinelli. He later campaigned for Metro Toronto's Black Creek ward in the 1991 municipal election, saying that he was running against the area's "NDP machine". He lost to Maria Augimeri. During the 1993 federal election, Crudo was part of a group of dissident Liberals who supported the candidacy of Peter Li Preti over Art Eggleton, following Eggleton's appointment as the riding's Liberal candidate.
Bruno Rea holds a Ph.D. in political philosophy from Oxford University. He worked as a policy adviser for the Ontario Ministry of Labour in the 1980s, researching and writing briefs on workers' compensation and employment standards. He was a member of the Liberal Party. In 1987, he wrote an editorial piece for The Globe and Mail newspaper opposing capital punishment. He was twenty-nine years old during the 1988 election, and called for a crackdown on crime and a slower pace of regional development. He was endorsed by the Toronto Star newspaper, and was originally regarded as a serious candidate for election. He was arrested one week prior to the election, after trying to dispose of 161 signs belonging to Anthony Perruzza, his New Democratic Party opponent, on the grounds of York University at 3:30 in the morning. He pleaded guilty to a charge of mischief in February 1989, and was fined. Rea was listed as a senior policy adviser for the Ministry of Labour in 2000.
John Butcher campaigned for the North York City Council on three occasions. In 1982 and 1985, he lost to Irving Chapley in Ward Seven. He was forty-four years old in 1988, and described himself as a lifelong resident of the ward. He acknowledged that he was not likely to win election.

Ward 6
x-Milton Berger 6,127 
Anne Lelovic 2,403

Ward 7
x-Irving W. Chapley 5,267 
Eric Cohen 4,595 
Mark Arshawsky 516

Ward 8
Joanne Flint 5,376 
Bob Yuill 3,462

Ward 9
x-Ron Summers 6,532 
Ernie Springolo 3,035

Ward 10
Don Yuill 3,338 
Cora Urbel 2,579 
Marg Middleton 948 
John Boysen 760 
Peter Bate 704 
Ramon Solevilla 546

Ward 11
x-Jim McGuffin 6,094 
Freddy Trasmundi 864

Ward 12
x-Barry Burton 3,868 
John Murphy 2,551 
Ronald Hyslop 856 
Peter Allis 527

Ward 13
Bob Bradley 4,453 
Marilyn Lastman 3,761 
Harvey Brooker 1,031 
Allan Ginsberg 544

Ward 14
x-Paul Sutherland acclaimed

School Board
Ward 1
Sheila Lambrinos 1,195 
Ted Wray 875 
Wendy Essex 638 
Doug Kvistbo 198

Ward 2
Bob Churchill 1,463 
Jim Darvill 774 
John Campbell 744 
Lilia Ruffolo 387 
Angelo Castellano 349 
Aurelio Caldarelli 238

Ward 3
x-Elizabeth Smith 960 
Stephnie Payne 728 
Philomen Wright 570 
Natalie Soobrian 482

Ward 4
x-Elsa Chandler 3,083 
Bob Daggett 762

Ward 5
x-Errol Young 2,862 
Leslie Soobrian 736

Ward 6

Phyllis Weinberg was 56 years old during the campaign, and was described as a psychotherapist and former teacher. She was listed in 1996 as the owner and operator of Orthodox Counselling Services, which offers support on stress management and family issues in the Orthodox Jewish community. She had previously campaigned for the North York Hydro Commission in 1985, finishing sixth out of nine candidates. She was twice asked to stop campaigning on the grounds of a public school in 1988, and was criticized for giving candy to children near school property. Weinberg argued that the complaints against her were part of a "mud-slinging campaign" designed to prevent her from winning the seat. She planned to campaign for the ward six seat again in the 1991 election, but withdrew before election day.

Ward 7
x-Mae Waese acclaimed

Ward 8
x-Gerri Gershon 6,205 
Trevor Tymchuk 1,203

Ward 9
x-Shelley Stillman 5,803 
Rose Yunger 1,756

Ward 10
x-Darlene Scott 4,997 
Rena Gordon 2,052

Ward 11
x-John Filion acclaimed

Ward 12
x-Ken Crowley acclaimed

Ward 13
x-Dan Hicks 5,235 
Gini Sharma 2,509

Ward 14
x-Ralph Belfry 4,741 
Dash Shah 1,461

Hydro Commission
(2 elected)
x-Carl Anderson 57,280 
Bob Dyer 44,177 
x-Jack Bedder 37,121 
Donald Hubbs 13,183 
Jack Arshawsky 12,506 
Irving Bricks 10,160

City of York

Mayor
Mario Faraone was a 47-year-old building designer, consultant, and the owner of the firm F.M. Faraone and Sons company. He campaigned in support of urban tax reform, better traffic planning and affordable housing. He was a member of the Liberal Party, but ran without a party endorsement. A 1990 article in the Toronto Star newspaper drew attention to the fact that the York adjustment committee approved every single proposal put forward by Faraone in 1989 through 1990, despite serious concerns from local residents in some instances. One of the committee members was Faraone's business partner, Jack Capitanio. Faraone denied any suggestion of wrongdoing, and argued that his success rate was a reflection of his experience in the building industry. Capitano also denied suggestions of favouritism. Mayor Fergy Brown responded to the article by saying that he would raise the matter at the next council meeting, and recommended the city's legal department start an investigation.  Newspaper reports do not indicate how the matter was resolved. Faraone has remained active in the building trade.

City Council
Of the eight ward races, six incumbents were returned. Newcomer Frances Nunziata beat incumbent Gary Bloor in Ward 7. Jim Fera was also a new member for Ward 5.

Ward 1
Ben Nobleman (incumbent) 2,228
Daria Bradbury 1,885

Ward 2
Tony Mandarano (incumbent) 2,558
Chai Kalevar 809
Frank Rogers 592

Ward 3
Tony Rizzo (incumbent) 1,965
Ron Bradd 1,786
Suzana Dozsa 404
Lisa Alliston 298
Dino Coletti 150
Ettore Reda 72
Roland Saggiorato (withdrew)

Ward 4
Nicolo Fortunato (incumbent) 1,421
Joan Roberts 1,179
Salvatore Sinopoli 458
Sydney King 181

Ward 5
Jim Fera 1,890
Enrico M. Iafolla 1,479
Dan Howells 597

Ward 6
Bob McLean (incumbent) 4,277
Rick Richards 1,367

Ward 7
Frances Nunziata 2,969
Gary Bloor (incumbent) 2,252
Gurpreet Malhotra 83

Ward 8
Bill Saundercook (incumbent, acclaimed)

Board of Trustees

Ward 1
Karen Hen (incumbent) 2,162
James Stevens 809

Ward 2*
Branko Jovanovich 833
Pete Karageorgos 826
Marion Ward 561

Election Night Results - Recount 
Ward 2 Post Recount
Branko Jovanovich 828
Pete Karageorgos 827
Marion Ward 561
 Due to irregularities by-election ordered by District Court Judge R.G. Conant

Ward 2 By-Election Results - June 19, 1989
Pete Karageorgos 537
Branko Jovanovich 527
Marion Ward 196

Ward 3
Ruth Russell (incumbent) 1,897
Peter Luci 559

Ward 4
Elizabeth Hill 760
Michael Bunker 442
Stefano Scopacasa 363
Charles Ashton 88

Ward 5
Patricia Hainer 1,260
Joseph Morriello 1,051

Ward 6
John Gibson (incumbent) 2,096
Brian Morgan 1,623

Ward 7
Steven Mold (incumbent) 2,551
Jon Gentry 1,005

Ward 8
Madeleine McDowell (incumbent) 1,804
Gaye Lew 1,129

References

1988
1988 elections in Canada
1988 in Toronto